

Events 
Bernardino Bertolotti becomes a court musician of the Este family at Ferrara.

Publications 
Costanzo Antegnati – First book of masses for six and eight voices (Venice: Angleo Gardano)
Giammateo Asola –  (Venice: Angelo Gardano), also includes two Magnificats
Lodovico Balbi –  for four voices (Venice: Angelo Gardano)
Paolo Bellasio – First book of madrigals for five voices (Venice: heirs of Girolamo Scotto)
Antoine de Bertrand
Third book of chansons for four voices (Paris: Le Roy & Ballard)
Joachim a Burck
 for four voices (Mühlhausen: Georg Hantzsch), settings of hymns by Ludwig Helmbold
 (Sacred odes of Ludwig Helmbold of Mühlhausen), book two (Mühlhausen: Georg Hantzsch), a collection of hymn settings
Antonio de Cabezón –  (Madrid: Francisco Sanchez), a collection of instrumental arrangements of pieces by various composers, published posthumously by his son Hernando
Ludwig Daser –  for four voices (Munich: Adam Berg), a setting of the Passion
Johannes Eccard –  (New German Songs) for four and five voices (Mühlhausen: Georg Hantzsch)
George de la Hèle – 8 Masses for five, six, and seven voices (Antwerp: Christophe Plantin)
Fernando de las Infantas
, book one, for four voices (Venice: Angelo Gardano)
, book two, for five voices (Venice: heirs of Girolamo Scotto)
Giorgio Mainerio –  for four voices (Venice: Angelo Gardano)
Tiburtio Massaino
First book of masses for five and six voices (Venice: Angelo Gardano)
Second book of madrigals for five voices (Venice: heirs of Girolamo Scotto)
Claudio Merulo
First book of motets for five voices (Venice: Angelo Gardano)
Second book of motets for five voices (Venice: Angelo Gardano)
Philippe de Monte – Seventh book of madrigals for five voices (Venice: Angelo Gardano)
Andreas Pevernage –  for six, seven, and eight voices (Douai: Jean Bogard)
Costanzo Porta – First book of masses for four, five, and six voices (Venice: Angelo Gardano)

Classical music 
Jan Trojan Turnovský –

Births 
December 2 – Agostino Agazzari, Sienese composer (died 1640)

Deaths 
probable – Francesco Portinaro, composer and humanist (born c.1520)

References

 
Music
16th century in music
Music by year